The Lotus Carlton (also called Vauxhall Lotus Carlton, Lotus Omega and Opel Lotus Omega) is a Vauxhall Carlton/Opel Omega A saloon upgraded by Lotus in order to be able to reach speeds up to 285 km/h (177 mph) with acceleration to equal contemporary sports cars. Like all Lotus vehicles, it was given a type designation—Type 104 in this case. The exterior changes were minimal with the addition of a rear spoiler, cooling vents on the bonnet, Lotus badges on the front wings and bootlid, a bodykit and considerably wider wheel arches distinguishing it from a standard Carlton. The car was only sold in one colour, a shade of green called Imperial Green (similar to British Racing Green).

Engine and drivetrain

Performance modifications started with an upgraded engine, which was enhanced by Lotus from the standard Opel  24v straight six unit (used in the GSi). The original distributor ignition system of the engine was replaced with a three-coil wasted spark system. The distributor drive was re-purposed as a water pump drive for the water-air intercooler circuit.

In addition to the aforementioned engine modifications, Lotus directed a number of engineering changes to the engine so that it would perform reliably with the higher power output. To cope with the higher cylinder pressures (about ), the external webbing on the engine block was reinforced. The crankshaft was replaced as well; early development crankshafts were machined from billet steel in Italy, but the production units were forged by Opel and sent to Maschinenfabrik Alfing Kessler for machining. The cylinder head was left mostly the same as the 4 valves per cylinder from the donor car, although the combustion chamber was milled to reduce the static compression ratio to 8.2:1 (from 10.0:1). The engine was fitted with forged slipper pistons produced by Mahle. Piston connecting rods were replaced with new units made to an original Lotus design.

The same ZF 6-speed manual transmission as fitted to a contemporary Chevrolet Corvette ZR-1 was used to transfer power output to the rear wheels via a rear limited-slip differential shared with the V8 Holden Commodore.

Chassis, brakes, and steering
The multi-link suspension of the Omega, already praised by the automotive press, was modified by Lotus for better high-speed stability and improved handling dynamics. To combat the problem of significant camber change (seen with the car at high speed and when fully laden), the self-leveling suspension from the Opel Senator was fitted. Also borrowed from the Senator was the Servotronic power steering system, which provides full power assist at parking speeds, and reduces the power assist as the road speed increases. The Lotus engineers would have preferred using a rack and pinion steering arrangement, but cost and space constraints limited them to the worm-and-roller arrangement.

Initial sketches for the wheels showed a split-rim composite design, but this was ultimately abandoned in favor of a monoblock wheel design, with cited concerns over the durability of the wheels in poor road conditions. The final design for the 17-inch wheels was manufactured by Ronal, along with wider tyres than those used on the Omega. The Omega is fitted with Goodyear Eagle tyres. The tyre compound used is the same as that on the Esprit Turbo SE, with a combination of oils and low hysteresis. This allows for improved high-speed stability and better performance in wet conditions.

The car is fitted with  brake discs manufactured by Portland Engineering in Dorset, UK with four-piston AP calipers at the front and  discs also manufactured by Portland Engineering in Dorset, UK with two-piston calipers at the rear.

Performance
The car was capable of accelerating from 0– in 5.2 seconds, and going from 0–124–0 km/h in less than 17 seconds. The Lotus Carlton held the title of the second fastest four-door saloon for some years, after the Alpina B10 Bi-Turbo.

Reception 
Because the Lotus Carlton could equal or exceed the performance of many contemporary sports cars from the likes of Ferrari and Porsche, while also comfortably carrying four passengers, it generated some controversy among the automotive and general press. Bob Murray, then editor of Autocar magazine, wrote: "Nobody buying this car could possibly argue he either needs or will be able to use a top whack which is claimed to be around 180 mph", and suggested that Vauxhall should follow the example set by German automakers (who had begun electronically limiting the top speed of their high-performance cars to 155 mph). Ultimately, Opel did not restrict the car's top speed.

The Lotus Carlton was a frequent target for thieves and joyriders in the UK. On 26 November 1993 a Lotus Carlton registered "40 RA" was reported stolen from a home in the West Midlands. In the following months, a gang of thieves used the car to conduct midnight ram raids, stealing around £20,000 worth of cigarettes and alcohol. A West Midlands Police officer said "We simply haven't been able to get near the thing and it looks unlikely that we ever will", as their police cars were incapable of safely pursuing the stolen Lotus Carlton. The car was never recovered and its current whereabouts are unknown, although in 2020 its original owner claimed that it was dumped in a canal, damaged beyond repair by a large object and subsequently scrapped.

A campaign by the Daily Mail and the Association of Chief Police Officers was launched to have the Lotus Carlton banned in the UK. The car's advertising was also condemned in Parliament. Despite gaining traction, the campaign to ban the Lotus Carlton ultimately failed.

Production
Production of the Lotus Carlton began in 1990, four years after the original Omega went on sale. Opel had hoped to build 1,100 cars in total, but owing to the recession of the early 1990s, the Lotus Carlton priced at £48,000 was not selling as well as anticipated and production at Lotus was halted in December 1992. Only 950 cars were completed: 320 Carltons and 630 Omegas, 150 short of the original target. The cars are now starting to become modern classics as low-mileage, well-looked-after examples become rare.

In 1991, the Italian design house Pininfarina produced a styling concept named the "Chronos" that was designed to accept the drivetrain from the Lotus Omega. The single example of the Chronos (sans engine) was displayed at the 1991 Detroit Auto Show.

Other markets
While the base Omega A and the Lotus Omega were never federalized for sale in the US, the Omega was cleared for grey import under the DOT's "Show or Display" exemption in 2011. By the end of 2017, all model years of the Lotus Carlton were past the 25-year mark, making them exempt from NHTSA import restrictions.

Specifications

References

External links

Photo
Audi RS6 v Jaguar S-Type R v BMW M5 (v Carlton) - evo magazine

Omega
Cars introduced in 1990
Rear-wheel-drive vehicles
Full-size vehicles
Sports sedans
Cars discontinued in 1992